The women's 200 metres T35 event at the 2020 Summer Paralympics in Tokyo took place on 29 August 2021.

Records
Prior to the competition, the existing records were as follows:

Results
The final took place on 29 August 2021, at 19:44:

References

Women's 200 metres T35
2021 in women's athletics